A graphoscope was a 19th-century device used in parlors in order to enhance the viewing of photographs and text. The graphoscope is supposed to be based on a 1864 patent of Charles John Rowsell.
These novelty items consisted of a single magnifying glass, often in a wooden frame, in an overall construction that could collapse into a compact rectangular form.  A photo/card holder was usually also included.  A KOMBI camera often had included its design a graphoscope for better film viewing. Many devices combined a Stereoscope and Graphoscope.

See also 
 Zograscope

Sources 
https://web.archive.org/web/20120204093105/http://www.eyeantiques.com/ViewingInstruments/Graphoscope.htm
http://www.bdcmuseum.org.uk/explore/item/69068/
https://web.archive.org/web/20160305080514/http://www.georgeglazer.com/archives/decarts/instruments/stereoscope.html
https://web.archive.org/web/20091026224453/http://geocities.com/mbarel.geo/kombi.html
https://web.archive.org/web/20171231195539/http://courses.ncssm.edu/gallery/collections/toys/html/exhibit12.htm

References

Magnifiers